Whispering Enemies is a 1939 American drama film directed by Lewis D. Collins and starring Jack Holt, Dolores Costello and Addison Richards.

Cast
 Jack Holt as Stephen Brewster 
 Dolores Costello as Laura Crandall 
 Addison Richards as Red Barrett 
 Joseph Crehan as George Harley 
 Donald Briggs as Fred Bowman 
 Paul Everton as Prison Warden 
 Pert Kelton as Virginia Daniels

References

Bibliography
 Darby, William. Masters of Lens and Light: A Checklist of Major Cinematographers and Their Feature Films. Scarecrow Press, 1991.

External links
 

1939 films
1939 drama films
1930s English-language films
American drama films
Films directed by Lewis D. Collins
Columbia Pictures films
1930s American films